Trawool was a small railway station located on the Mansfield line.
A loop siding was also provided and was used for express trains and freight trains to pass regular trains.

References

Railway stations in Australia opened in 1883
Railway stations closed in 1978
Disused railway stations in Victoria (Australia)
Mansfield railway line